This is a list of buildings that are examples of the Art Deco architectural style in New York (state), United States.

Albany 
 Alfred E. Smith Building, Albany, 1928
 Home Savings Bank Building, Albany, 1927
 James T. Foley United States Courthouse, Albany, 1930s
 Madison Theater, Albany, 1929
 Miss Albany Diner, Albany, 1941
 Palace Theatre, Albany, 1930
 Philip Livingston Magnet Academy, Albany, 1930s
 Spectrum 8 Theaters (former Delaware Theater), Albany, 1940s
 Trinity United Methodist Church, Albany, 1926
 White Tower Hamburgers, Albany

Buffalo 
 Buffalo Central Terminal, Buffalo, 1929
 Buffalo City Hall, Buffalo, 1931
 Buffalo Design Collaborative Building, Buffalo, 1930
 Buffalo Fire Department Headquarters, Buffalo, 1931
 Electric Tower, Buffalo, 1901, 1923–28
 Hotel Lafayette, Buffalo, 1926
 Kary Building, Buffalo, 1938
 Kensington High School, Buffalo, 1937
 Tonawanda Municipal Building, Kenmore, 1936

Liberty 
 Munson Diner, Liberty, 1945
 Town and Country Building, Liberty, 1890, 1950
 Yaun Co., Inc. Building, Liberty

New York City

The Bronx 
 1100 Grand Concourse, The Bronx, 1928
 Beacon Apartments, The Bronx, 1937
 Bronx County Courthouse, The Bronx, 1931
 Bronx Park Medical Pavilion, The Bronx, 1928
 Cardinal Hayes Memorial High School, The Bronx, 1941
 Community School for Social Justice, The Bronx, 1955
 Concourse Yard Entry Buildings and Substation, Jerome Park, The Bronx, 1933
 Crotona Play Center, The Bronx, 1936
 Fish Building, The Bronx, 1937
 Grand Concourse Buildings, The Bronx, 1935–1941
 Herman Ridder Junior High School, The Bronx, 1931
 Hull Manor Apartments, The Bronx, 1936
 Jerome Park Reservoir, North Bronx, 1906
 Noonan Plaza Apartments, The Bronx, 1931
 Orchard Beach Bathhouse and Promenade, The Bronx, 1937
 Park Plaza Apartments, The Bronx, 1931
 Rainey Memorial Gates, The Bronx, 1934
 Riva Apartments, The Bronx, 1931
 Samuel Gompers High School, The Bronx, 1932
 Town Towers, The Bronx, 1931
 Tremont Towers, The Bronx, 1936
 Van Cortlandt Park Stadium, The Bronx, 1939
 Wagner Building, The Bronx, 1931

Brooklyn 
 BelTel Lofts (former New York Telephone Company), Downtown Brooklyn, Brooklyn, 1930
 Betsy Head Memorial Pool, Brownsville, Brooklyn, 1940
 Brighton Beach Apartments and Garden Apartments, Brooklyn, 1934
 Brooklyn Printing Plant, New York Times, Brooklyn, 1929
 Church of the Immaculate Heart of Mary, Windsor Terrace, Brooklyn, 1934
 Coney Island Fire Station Pumping Station, Coney Island, Brooklyn, 1938
 Congregation Beth Elohim, Park Slope, Brooklyn, 1929
 Cranlyn Apartments, Downtown, Brooklyn, Brooklyn, 1931
 Kingsway Jewish Center, Midwood, Brooklyn, 1951 and 1957
 Manhattan Beach Jewish Center, Manhattan Beach, Brooklyn, 1952
 McCarren Park Pool, Brooklyn, 1936
 Montague–Court Building, Downtown Brooklyn, Brooklyn, 1927
 National Title Guaranty Building, Brooklyn, 1930
 Nostrand Theatre (now a gym), Brooklyn, 1938
 Sears & Roebuck Company, Brooklyn, 1932
 Sol Goldman Recreation Center, Brooklyn, 1936
 Village Diner, Red Hook, Brooklyn, 1951
 Williamsburgh Savings Bank Tower, Brooklyn, 1929

Manhattan 
 1 Wall Street, Manhattan, 1931
 2 Horatio Street, Manhattan, 1931
 2 Park Avenue, Midtown Manhattan, Manhattan, 1928
 3 East 84th Street, Upper East Side, Manhattan, 1928
 10 East 40th Street, Manhattan, 1929
 14 Wall Street, Manhattan, 1912 and 1933
 15 Central Park West, Manhattan, 2008
 19 East 72nd, Upper East Side, Manhattan, 1937
 20 East End Avenue, Manhattan, 2016
 20 Exchange Place, Financial District, Manhattan, 1931
 20th Century Fox Building, Midtown West, Manhattan, 1930
 21 West Street, Financial District, Manhattan, 1931
 29 Broadway, Manhattan, 1931
 30 Rockefeller Plaza, Rockefeller Center, Manhattan, 1933
 32 Avenue of the Americas, Manhattan, 1932
 40 Wall Street, Manhattan, 1930
 45 Christopher Street, Manhattan, 1931
 55 Central Park West, Manhattan, 1929
 59 West 12th Street, Manhattan, 1931
 60 Hudson Street, Manhattan, 1930
 70 Pine Street, Manhattan, 1932
 88 Greenwich Street, Manhattan, 1930
 90 Church Street, Manhattan, 1935
 95 Christopher Street, West Village, Manhattan, 1931
 111 Eighth Avenue, Chelsea, Manhattan, 1932
 116 John Street, Manhattan, 1931
 120 Bennett Avenue, Washington Heights, Manhattan, 1939
 120 Wall Street, Financial District, Manhattan, 1930
 130 Cedar Street, Manhattan, 1931
 155–165 West 20th Street, Chelsea, Manhattan, 1938
 200 West 86th Street, Upper West Side, Manhattan, 1931
 240 Central Park South, Columbus Circle, Manhattan, 1940
 310 East 55th Street, Sutton Place, Manhattan, 1932
 315 West 36th Street, Midtown Manhattan, Manhattan1926
 316 Riverside Drive, Upper West Side, Manhattan, 1933
 330 West 42nd Street, Manhattan, 1931
 336 Central Park West, Central Park West Historic District, Upper West Side, Manhattan, 1929
 350 Cabrini Boulevard, Washington Heights, Manhattan, 1930s
 369th Regiment Armory, Harlem, Manhattan, 1913
 370 Riverside Drive, Manhattan, 1922
 386 Fort Washington, Washington Heights, Manhattan, 1930s
 411 West End Avenue, Upper West Side, Manhattan, 1936
 500 Fifth Avenue, Manhattan, 1931
 570 Lexington Avenue, Manhattan, 1931
 745 Fifth Avenue (former Squibb Building), Midtown, Manhattan, 1931
 834 Fifth Avenue, Manhattan, 1931
 880 Fifth Avenue, Manhattan, 1948
 930 Fifth Avenue, Manhattan, 1940
 960 Fifth Avenue, Manhattan, 1928
 1501 Broadway, Manhattan 1927
 A. S. Beck Building, Midtown Manhattan, Manhattan
 American Radiator Building, Manhattan, 1924
 American Stock Exchange Building, Manhattan, 1921
 Americas Tower, Manhattan, 1993
 The Ardsley Apartments, Upper West Side, Manhattan, 1931
 Baruch College Administration Building, Midtown Manhattan, Midtown, 1939
 Beaux-Arts Institute of Design, Turtle Bay, Manhattan, 1928
 Beekman Tower, Manhattan, 1928
 Bricken Casino Building, Midtown Manhattan, Manhattan, 1931
 Brill Building, Manhattan, 1931
 Carlyle Hotel, Manhattan, 1930
 Central IND Substation, Midtown Manhattan, Manhattan, 1932
 The Century, Manhattan, 1931
 Chanin Building, Manhattan, 1929
 Chelsea Clearview Cinema, Manhattan
 Chrysler Building, Midtown East, Manhattan, 1931
 Columbia University Medical Center, Upper Manhattan, Manhattan, 1928
 Congregation Beth Elohim, Manhattan, 1929
 Continental Bank Building, Manhattan, 1932
 Daily News Building, Turtle Bay, Manhattan, 1930
 Downtown Athletic Club, Manhattan, 1930
 DuMont Building, Manhattan, 1931
 The El Dorado, Manhattan, 1931
 Empire Diner, Chelsea, Manhattan, 1943
 Empire State Building, Manhattan, 1931
 Film Center Building, Manhattan, 1928
 Fourth Church of Christ, Scientist, Washington Heights, Manhattan, 1932
 Fred F. French Building, Midtown Manhattan, Manhattan, 1927
 Fuller Building, Manhattan, 1929
 General Electric Building, Midtown Manhattan, Manhattan, 1931
 Gramercy House, Stuyvesant Square, Manhattan, 1930
 Gramercy Theatre, Gramercy Park, Manhattan, 1937
 Graybar Building, Midtown Manhattan, Manhattan, 1927
 Greenwich Substation 235, Greenwich Village, Manhattan, 1932
 Harlem Substation 219, Upper Manhattan, Manhattan, 1928
 Hebrew Tabernacle of Washington Heights, Washington Heights, Manhattan
 Horn & Hardart Building, Upper West Side, Manhattan, 1930
 Hotel Paris, Manhattan, 1931
 Ivey Delph Apartments, Hamilton Heights, Manhattan, 1951
 Joan of Arc Junior High School, Upper West Side, Manhattan, 1940
 JW Marriott Essex House, Manhattan, 1931
 Lefcourt Colonial Building, Midtown Manhattan, Manhattan, 1930
 Lescaze House, Manhattan, 1934
 Madison Belmont Building, Midtown Manhattan, Manhattan, 1925
 The Majestic, Manhattan, 1931
 Mark Hellinger Theatre, Midtown Manhattan, Manhattan, 1930
 Master Apartments, Upper West Side, Manhattan, 1929
 Mayo Ballroom, Upper East Side, Manhattan, 1927
 Metro Theater, Manhattan
 Metropolitan Life North Building, Flatiron District, Manhattan, 1928
 Millinery Center Synagogue, Garment District, Manhattan, 1933
 Municipal Asphalt Plant, Upper East Side, Manhattan, 1941
 Nelson Tower, Garment District, Manhattan, 1931
 New York Evening Post Building, Lower Manhattan, Manhattan, 1926
 New York Women's House of Detention, Manhattan, 1932
 The Normandy, Manhattan, 1938
 The Paris Apartments, Upper West Side, Manhattan, 1931
 Radio City Music Hall, Midtown Manhattan, Manhattan, 1932
 Rockefeller Center, Midtown Manhattan, Manhattan, 1930–1939
 The San Remo, Manhattan, 1930
 Sherman Square Studios, Upper West Side, Manhattan, 1929
 Sofia Apartments, Upper West Side, Manhattan, 1930
 Sofia Brothers Warehouse (now a Kent Automatic Parking Garage), Upper West Side, Manhattan, 1930
 St. Luke's Lutheran Church, Theater District, Manhattan, 1923
 Starrett–Lehigh Building, Chelsea, Manhattan, 1931
 Substation 219, Harlem, Manhattan, 1932
 Substation 409, Lower East Side, Manhattan, 1936
 The Tombs, Lower Manhattan, Manhattan, 1939
 The Towne House, Murray Hill, Manhattan, 1930
 United States Post Office (Canal Street Station), Manhattan, 1937
 Verizon Building, Tribeca, Manhattan, 1923–1927
 Waldorf Astoria New York, Midtown Manhattan, Manhattan, 1931
 Wyndham New Yorker Hotel, Garment District, Manhattan, 1930

Queens 
 43-25 43rd Street, Queens, 1940
 63-45 Wetherole Street, Queens, 1936
 135-18 Northern Boulevard, Queens, 1937
 166-02 Jamaica Avenue, Queens, 1938
 Astoria Park Pool, Queens, 1936
 Bayside National Bank, Queens, 1938
 Beverly Hall, Queens, 1936
 Blessed Sacrament Church Complex, Queens, 1933–1949
 Bombay Theatre (former Mayfair Theatre), Fresh Meadows, Queens, 1940
 Bowery Bay Wastewater Treatment Plant, Queens, 1939
 Celtic Park Apartments A and B, Queens, 1931
 Church of the Most Precious Blood interior, Queens, 1932
 Concord Hall, Queens, 1940
 Dunolly Gardens, Queens, 1939
 Eagle Theatre (former Earle Theatre), Queens, 1939
 Electra Court, Queens, 1931
 Fair Theatre, Queens, 1937
 Golden Gate Apartments, Queens, 1931
 Greater Flushing Chamber of Commerce Building, Queens, 1939
 J. Kurtz and Sons Store Building, Jamaica, Queens, 1931
 Jacob Riis Park, Queens, 1936
 Jamaica 104th Field Artillery – 168th Street Armory, Queens, 1933
 Jamaica Savings Bank, Queens, 1939
 Kaufman Astoria Studios, Queens, 1921
 La Casina, Jamaica, Queens, 1907, 1936
 Lexington Office Building, Queens, 1931
 Little Neck National Bank, Queens, 1929
 Maple Court Apartments, Queens, 1930
 Marine Air Terminal at LaGuardia Airport, Queens, 1939
 Martel Manor, Queens, 1938
 Midway Theater, Queens, 1942
 Miller Building, Queens, 1928
 National City Bank of New York, Queens, 1931
 Park Place Apartments, Queens, 1942
 Phipps Garden Apartments, Queens, 1931
 Public School, 166 Henry Gradstein, Queens, 1936
 Queens Hospital Center Power Plant, Queens, 1932
 Rego Park Jewish Center, Queens, 1948
 Ridgewood Savings Bank, Ridgewood, Queens, 1921
 St. Andrew Avellino Roman Catholic Church, Queens, 1940
 Salvation Army Community Center Queens Temple Corps, Queens, 1952
 Suffolk Title Building (now Title Guarantee Company), Queens, 1929
 Triboro Hospital for Tuberculosis, Queens, 1940
 Trylon Theater, Queens, 1939
 Virginia Apartments, Queens, 1938
 United States Post Office, Forest Hills, Queens, 1937
 Worthmore Hall, Queens, 1930
 Young Women's Leadership School, Queens, 1928

Staten Island 
 Ambassador Hotel, Staten Island, 1932
 Bayley Seton Hospital, Staten Island, 1933–1936
 Joseph H. Lyons Pool, Staten Island, 1936
 Lane Theater, Staten Island, 1938
 New York City Department of Health Building, Staten Island, 1935
 Paramount Theater, Staten Island, 1935

Niagara Falls 
 The Niagara, Niagara Falls, 1925
 United Office Building, Niagara Falls, 1929
 Wendt's Dairy, Niagara Falls, 1948

Rochester 
 Cinema Theater, Rochester, 1914 and 1941
 Little Theatre, Rochester, 1928
 Reynolds Arcade, Rochester, 1932
 Rochester Fire Department Headquarters and Shops, Rochester, 1936
 Rundel Memorial Library, Rochester, 1936
 Times Square Building , Rochester, 1929
 WROC-TV Broadcasting Center, Rochester, 1949

Syracuse 
 New York Central Railroad Passenger and Freight Station, Syracuse, 1936
 Niagara Mohawk Building, Syracuse, 1932
 State Tower Building, Syracuse, 1928
 Upstate Medical University Arena at Onondaga County War Memorial, Syracuse, 1951

Other cities 
 104–116 West Water Street, Elmira, 1870 and 1934
 271 North Avenue, New Rochelle, 1930
 Former American Legion Judson P. Galloway Post at 62 Grand Avenue, Newburgh
 Amityville Memorial High School, Amityville
 Boardwalk Bandshell, Jones Beach State Park, Nassau County, 1929
 Boulton Center for the Performing Arts, Bay Shore, 1914 and 1934
 Center Theatre, Woodbourne, 1938
 Church Building, Poughkeepsie, 1932
 Citizens National Bank, Springville, 1939
 Congregation B'nai Sholom Beth David, Rockville Centre
 Doane Stuart School, Rensselaer, 1931
 E-J Victory Factory Building, Johnson City Historic District, Johnson City, 1920
 Elmira Coca-Cola Bottling Company Works, Elmira, 1939
 Erie Railroad Station, Jamestown
 Fantasy Theatre, Rockville Centre, 1929
 Genung's Department Store (now New York State Worker's Compensation Board), Peekskill, 1949
 Greyhound Bus Station, Binghamton, 1938
 Jamestown Station, Jamestown, 1930
 Lancaster Municipal Building, Lancaster, 1940
 Mann Library, Ithaca, 1953
 New Family Theater, Mount Morris, 1939
 Olean High School, Olean, 1937
 Oswego Theater, Oswego, 1940
 Oyster Bay High School, Oyster Bay, 1929
 Paramount Theatre, Middletown, 1930
 Pilgrim Furniture Company Factory, Kingston
 Red Robin Diner, Johnson City Historic District, Johnson City, 1950
 Rivoli Theatre, South Fallsburg, 1923 and 1937
 Rockland County Courthouse and Dutch Gardens, New City, 1928
 Schenectady Armory, Schenectady, 1936
 Schines Auburn Theatre, Auburn, 1938
 Seaford Palace Diner, Seaford
 Smith & Percy Building, Watertown, 1930s
 Smith's Opera House, Geneva, 1894 and 1931
 Southwood Two-Teacher School, Jamesville, 1938
 Tarrytown Music Hall interior, Tarrytown, 1885 and 1922
 Thomass Ham 'n Eggery, Mineola, 1946
 Tuckahoe High School, Eastchester, 1931
 United States Post Office, Catskill, 1935
 United States Post Office, Hempstead, 1932
 United States Post Office, New Rochelle, 1937
 United States Post Office, Patchogue, 1932
 United States Post Office, Seneca Falls, 1934
 United States Post Office, Suffern, 1936
 United States Post Office, Waverly, 1937
 United States Post Office, Yonkers, 1927
 United States Post Office – Rockville Centre, Hempstead, 1937
 Vestal Central School, Vestal, 1939
 WBEN Transmitter Building, Grand Island
 WKBW Transmitter Building, Hamburg
 Westchester County Center, White Plains, 1924

See also 
 List of Art Deco architecture
 List of Art Deco architecture in the United States

References 

 "Art Deco & Streamline Moderne Buildings." Roadside Architecture.com. Retrieved 2019-01-03.
 Cinema Treasures. Retrieved 2022-09-06
 "Court House Lover". Flickr. Retrieved 2022-09-06
 "New Deal Map". The Living New Deal. Retrieved 2020-12-25.
 "New York Registry & Map – Art Deco Society of New York". Archived from the original on 2019-01-03. Retrieved 2019-01-03
 "SAH Archipedia". Society of Architectural Historians. Retrieved 2021-11-21.

External links
 

 
Art Deco
Art Deco architecture in New York (state)
New York (state)-related lists